St Peters Football Club is a Saint Kitts and Nevis football club from Basseterre.

They usually play in the Saint Kitts and Nevis Premier Division, but due to a conflict between the FA and the majority of the clubs, they did not take part in 2008/09.

Current squad

Staff

Achievements
Easter Cup
Champions (1): 2014

SKNFA Premier League 
Runners-up (1): 2009-10

External links
Club profile – SKNFA

Football clubs in Saint Kitts and Nevis